Tipaza (formerly Tefessedt, Chenoua-Berber: ⴱⴰⵣⴰⵔ Bazar) is the capital of the Tipaza Province, Algeria. When it was part of the Roman Empire, it was called Tipasa. The modern town was founded in 1857, and is chiefly remarkable for its ancient ruins and sandy littoral.

History

Ancient history

Tipasa, as the city was then called, was an old Punic trading-post conquered by Ancient Rome. It was subsequently turned into a military colony by the emperor Claudius for the conquest of the kingdoms of Mauretania.

Afterwards it became a municipium called Colonia Aelia Tipasensis, that reached the population of 20,000 inhabitants in the fourth century according to Stéphane Gsell.

The city served as an important Christian hub during the last centuries of Roman governorship, with three basilicas.

Tipasa was destroyed by the Vandals in 430 CE, but was reconstructed by the Byzantines one century later. At the end of the seventh century the city was demolished by Umayyad forces and reduced to ruins.

In the nineteenth century the place was settled again. Now it is a town of nearly 30,000 inhabitants. The city is an important tourist place in modern Algeria, mainly because of the Tipasa ruins.

Modern era
Near Tipaza, the Tipaza longwave transmitter broadcasts French language Channel 3 radio programs from the Algerian Broadcasting Company. The longwave frequency 252 kHz can be well received in many parts of Europe.

The town and its surroundings is home to the largest Berber-speaking group of western Algeria, the Chenoua people.

The Tipaza station in 252 kHz had previously been out of service since March 17, 2014, but is broadcasting again at 252 kHz.

Gallery

See also
 List of lighthouses in Algeria
 Tipasa
 Tipaza Province
 Algeria

References

External links

 Tipasa Museum
Site of Unesco

Populated places established in 1857
Communes of Tipaza Province
Archaeological sites in Algeria
World Heritage Sites in Algeria
Former populated places in Algeria
Province seats of Algeria
Tipasa
Berber populated places
1857 establishments in the French colonial empire
Lighthouses in Algeria
Phoenician colonies in Algeria